Culm or The Culm may refer to:

 Culm (anthracite), meaning of "culm" in British English, a kind of coal found in the Culm Measures, and a term used for fine-grained waste from anthracite coal
Culm bomb or culm ball
 Culm (botany), the stem of a grass or sedge
 Culm (waste coal), meaning of "culm" in American English
 Culm Measures, a geological formation of England
 Culm National Character Area, an area defined by Natural England 
 River Culm, in Mid-Devon, England
 Culm bank, a coalmine waste or spoil heap, a pitheap or as misnamed 'a slagheap'
 Culm grassland, semi-natural grassland containing abundant purple moor grass
 Culm, the German name of Chełmno, Poland, also spelled Kulm

See also
 Kulm (disambiguation)